Terje Halleland  (born 14 April 1966) is a Norwegian politician. 
He was elected representative to the Storting for the period 2017–2021 for the Progress Party. He is a member of the Standing Committee on Energy and the Environment.

References

1966 births
Living people
Progress Party (Norway) politicians
Members of the Storting
Rogaland politicians